Tang-e Lateh (also Romanized as Tang Lateh; also known as Tang-i-Laleh) is a village in Kolijan Rostaq-e Sofla Rural District, in the Central District of Sari County, Mazandaran Province, Iran. At the 2006 census, its population was 951, in 245 families.

References 

Populated places in Sari County